Franco Landella (born 1 May 1966 in Foggia) is an Italian politician.

He is a member of the centre-right party Forza Italia. He was elected Mayor of Foggia on 8 June 2014 and took office on 11 June. He has been re-elected for a second term in 2019. In August 2020, he left Forza Italia and joined right-wing populist party Lega Nord.

In May 2021, Landella is arrested with the charges of corruption and attempted extortion.

See also
2014 Italian local elections
2019 Italian local elections
List of mayors of Foggia

References

External links
 

1966 births
Living people
Mayors of places in Apulia
People from Foggia
Forza Italia (2013) politicians
Lega Nord politicians